Matthew Darr (born July 2, 1992) is a former American football punter. He was signed by the Miami Dolphins as an undrafted free agent in 2015. He played college football at Tennessee.

College career
Darr spent five seasons at Tennessee from 2010-2014 under head coaches Derek Dooley and Butch Jones.

Professional career

Miami Dolphins
Darr signed with the Miami Dolphins on May 2, 2015. He won the punting competition over veteran punter Brandon Fields. 

On September 2, 2017, Darr was waived by the Dolphins.

Buffalo Bills
On November 27, 2018, Darr signed with the Buffalo Bills.

New York Jets
On May 20, 2019, Darr signed with the New York Jets. He was released on August 31, 2019.

NFL career statistics

|-
! style="text-align:center;"| 2015
! style="text-align:center;"| MIA
| 16 || 92 || 4,380 || 47.6 || 39.7 || 70 || 0
|-
! style="text-align:center;"| 2016
! style="text-align:center;"| MIA
| 16 || 90 || 3,991 || 44.3 || 39.9 || 66 || 0
|-
! style="text-align:center;"| 2018
! style="text-align:center;"| BUF
| 5 || 20 || 809 || 40.5 || 36.3 || 55 || 0
|-
! style="text-align:center;" colspan="2"| Career || 37 || 202 || 9,180 || 45.4 || 39.5 || 70 || 0
|}

References

External links
ESPN bio
Tennessee Volunteers bio

Living people
1992 births
Players of American football from Bakersfield, California
Tennessee Volunteers football players
Miami Dolphins players
Buffalo Bills players
New York Jets players